Mary Ann Sutherland (1864–1948) was a notable New Zealand farmer and landowner. She was born in Pirinoa, Wairarapa, New Zealand in 1864.

References

1864 births
1948 deaths
New Zealand farmers